The XIII FIFA World Cup was scheduled to take place in Colombia, between May 31 and June 29, 1986. However, Colombia declined after being chosen as the venue, marking an unprecedented and unrepeated event in the history of the World Cups.

Mexico became the first country to hold a World Cup twice, when the FIFA Executive Committee, after a meeting in Stockholm, Sweden in May 1983, decided to replace the host country selected in 1974, Colombia, which had to decline in November 1982 due to the impossibility of complying with the requirements that FIFA demanded to celebrate the event.

Background

In 1973, the Colombian Football/Soccer Federation had submitted its candidacy to FIFA to organize the 1986 World Cup. The country received the commission of the governing body of world football/soccer that year, and the friendship between Alfonso Senior Quevedo (Colombian sports dirigent) and Sir Stanley Rous (president of FIFA) helped to achieve the venue.

On June 9, 1974, FIFA designated Colombia as the venue for the 1986 FIFA World Cup. However, with the passing of time, due to the few progress in the works of the stadia and the requirements of FIFA Executive Committee, the possibility that the country could really host the event was diluted.

By the time the venue was awarded to Colombia, the FIFA World Cup was contested by 16 teams, but the format was expanded to 24 since the 1982 edition.

In 1970, during the National Games (the Colombian multi-sport event), Alfonso Senior obtained the support of then President Carlos Lleras Restrepo to launch the candidacy for the World Cup.

In 1974, Colombian president Misael Pastrana congratulated Alfonso Senior for the designation of Colombia to celebrate the tournament:

In the final of the 1982 FIFA World Cup in Spain, a banner read "Nos vemos en el Mundial Colombia 86" (See you at the World Cup Colombia 86). The back cover of the Colombian edition of the Panini sticker album of the same World Cup had the announcement "Apoyamos el Mundial Colombia 86" (We support the World Cup Colombia 86).​ In 1982 the Colombia-86 Corporation was created, created by private parties such as the Grancolombiano Group and Bavaria (which would withdraw) to finance the World Cup.

FIFA requirements

 12 stadiums with a minimum capacity of 40,000 people for the first phase.
 4 stadiums with a minimum capacity of 60,000 people for the second phase.
 2 stadiums with a minimum capacity of 80,000 people for the opening match and the final.
 The installation of a communication tower in Bogotá.
 Freezing of hotel rates in national currency for FIFA members as of January 1, 1986.
 The issuance of a decree that would legalize the free circulation of international currency in the country.
 A robust fleet of limousines available to the FIFA executives.
 A railway network between the host cities.
 Airports with the capacity to land jet planes at all venues.
 A network of roads that would allow the easy movement of the fans.

Proposed venues

A total of 5 stadiums in the same number of cities were presented by Colombia for the World Cup. All the stadia were going to be repaired and one was going to be completely new. These stadiums were:

 Nemesio Camacho "El Campín" Stadium in Bogotá
 Pascual Guerrero Stadium in Cali
 Metropolitan Stadium Roberto Meléndez in Barranquilla (new stadium)
 Atanasio Girardot Stadium in Medellín
 Alfonso López Stadium in Bucaramanga

Withdrawal of hosting duties

The Colombian government considered these requirements as excessive and impossible to meet. Therefore, on October 25, 1982, the president of Colombia Belisario Betancur announced the cancellation of the organization of the event. Colombia's resignation from hosting the 1986 World Cup was confirmed by FIFA on November 5, 1982.

For the election of the new venue there were 4 candidate countries: Canada, Brazil, United States and Mexico, although Brazil withdrew shortly before the designation while the United States, which did not have much support, preferred to organize a better candidacy for the 1994 FIFA World Cup (from which the country was elected). Both countries inclined their support to the Mexican candidacy. Finally, on May 20, 1983, FIFA unanimously designated Mexico, which had already hosted the 1970 FIFA World Cup and thus maintained the tactic of rotating venues between Europe and Latin America.

Consequences and legacy

Alfonso Senior Quevedo was one of the first to regret President Betancur's decision, before resigning from the presidency of the Colombian football/soccer Federation (FCF).

Colombia did not organize an important national team tournament until the 2001 Copa América, an event that the Canadian national team declined to attend, due to logistical problems with their football/soccer players. The Argentinian national team didn't attend too, due to an alleged risk to their safety.

The country applied again to organize the 2014 FIFA World Cup, which was announced by the then President Álvaro Uribe, at the opening of the Central American and Caribbean Games held in Cartagena, on July 15, 2006. On April 11, 2007, the president of the FCF Luis Bedoya announced that he would confirm Colombia's resignation to host the tournament, leaving Brazil as the only candidate, and subsequently chosen as the venue for the tournament. However, on May 26, 2008, Colombia was designated as the venue for the 2011 U-20 FIFA World Cup, the first FIFA tournament hosted in Colombia.

Later, in August 2016, Colombia announced its intention to host the 2023 Women's World Cup, but on June 25, 2020, FIFA President Gianni Infantino announced Australia and New Zealand as hosts of the tournament, defeating the Colombia's candidacy by a vote of 22–13 in the first and only round of votes.

This is not the only time that Colombia has lost the venue for an international sporting event, since on May 20, 2021, Conmebol decided to take away the venue for the 2021 Copa América due to public order problems as a result of protests in the country.

See also
 Football in Colombia
 1986 FIFA World Cup
 2001 Copa América
 2011 FIFA U-20 World Cup
 2014 FIFA World Cup bids
 Colombia 2023 FIFA Women's World Cup bid
 2021 Copa América
 2022 Copa América Femenina

References

External links
 
 

1986 FIFA World Cup
Football in Colombia